Jungle Ki Beti is a 1988 Hindi adventure fantasy film of Bollywood, directed by R. Thakkar and produced by Anil Singh. Music director of the film was Rajesh Roshan.

Plot
This is the story of girl who lives in jungle and tries to protect the forest from the poacher and mafias.

Cast
 Salma Agha
 Rakesh Bedi
 Goga Kapoor
 Joginder
 Kalpana Iyer
 Arjun (Firoz Khan)
 Mohan Choti
 Brando Bakshi

References

External links
 

1988 films
Indian fantasy adventure films
Indian erotic films
1980s Hindi-language films
Films scored by Rajesh Roshan